Austrian may refer to:

 Austrians, someone from Austria or of Austrian descent
 Someone who is considered an Austrian citizen, see Austrian nationality law
 Austrian German dialect
 Something associated with the country Austria, for example:
 Austria-Hungary
 Austrian Airlines (AUA)
 Austrian cuisine
 Austrian Empire
 Austrian monarchy
 Austrian German (language/dialects)
 Austrian literature
 Austrian nationality law
 Austrian Service Abroad
 Music of Austria
Austrian School of Economics
 Economists of the Austrian school of economic thought
 The Austrian Attack variation of the Pirc Defence chess opening.

See also 

 
 
 Austria (disambiguation)
 Australian (disambiguation)
 L'Autrichienne (disambiguation)

Language and nationality disambiguation pages